Frederick VI (Danish and ; 28 January 17683 December 1839) was King of Denmark from 13 March 1808 to 3 December 1839 and King of Norway from 13 March 1808 to 7 February 1814, making him the last king of Denmark–Norway. From 1784 until his accession, he served as regent during his father's mental illness and was referred to as the "Crown Prince Regent". For his motto he chose God and the just cause and since the time of his reign, succeeding Danish monarchs have also chosen mottos in the Danish language rather than the formerly customary Latin. As Frederick VI had no surviving sons to succeed him (only two daughters), he was succeeded on the throne of Denmark by his half-first cousin Christian, who was his father's half-brother's son.

Early life

Birth and family

The future King Frederick VI was born between 10 and 11 p.m. on 28 January 1768 in the Queen's Bedchamber at Christiansborg Palace, the royal residence in central Copenhagen. Born into the House of Oldenburg, the royal house which had ruled Denmark since its foundation there in the 15th century, he was the first child born to King Christian VII and Queen Caroline Mathilde of Denmark and Norway. He was born 15 months after his parents' wedding, the day before his father's 19th birthday, and while his mother was just 16 years old. The king had shown little interest in the queen after the marriage and only reluctantly visited her in her chambers. The king's advisors had to step in, among other things with love letters written in the king's name, in an attempt to make the marriage lead to a pregnancy and thus an heir to the throne.

Frederick's father had been king for two years at the time of the birth, and as the reigning king's eldest son, Frederick automatically became crown prince at birth, and thus replaced his father's half-brother, Hereditary Prince Frederick (Arveprins Frederik), as the heir to the throne. The young prince was baptised already two days after the birth on 30 January at Christiansborg Palace by Ludvig Harboe, Bishop of Zealand, and was named after his late grandfather, King Frederick V. His godparents were King Christian VII (his father), the dowager queen Juliana Maria (his step-grandmother) and his half-uncle, Hereditary Prince Frederick.

Childhood and upbringing

At the time of Crown Prince Frederick's birth, conditions at the Danish court were characterized by Christian VII's increasing mental illness, including suspected schizophrenia expressed by catatonic periods. In the resulting intrigues and power struggles which followed, Christian's personal physician, the progressive and radical thinker Johann Friedrich Struensee, became the king's advisor and rose steadily in power during the late 1760s, and from 1770 to 1772, Struensee was de facto regent of the country. Struensee soon also became the confidant of Queen Caroline Mathilde, Frederick's mother, partly because during a smallpox epidemic in the autumn of 1769, in which over 1000 children died, he successfully inoculated Crown Prince Frederick with good results. In doing so, Struensee won the gratitude and trust of the neglected queen and soon became her lover as well. It is widely believed that Struensee was also the biological father of Prince Frederick's only sister Princess Louise Augusta, who was born in 1771.

Both the Queen and Struensee were ideologically influenced by Enlightenment thinkers such as Voltaire and Jean-Jacques Rousseau, and while Struensee was in power, the young Crown Prince Frederick was raised at Hirschholm Palace following the educational approach advocated by Rousseau in his famous work Émile. Instead of receiving direct instruction, Frederick was expected to learn everything through his own efforts through playing with two commoner boys as per Struensee's instructions.

The general ill will against Struensee found expression in a conspiracy against him in the name of the Queen Dowager Juliana Maria, and in the early morning of 17 January 1772 Struensee was deposed in a palace coup. Struensee was later executed, while the king and queen were divorced. Queen Caroline Mathilde was exiled, and the four-year-old Frederick and his sister were left behind, never to see their mother again. After the revolt against Struensee, Frederick's 18-year-old half-uncle Hereditary Prince Frederick was made regent. The real power, however, was held by Hereditary Prince Frederick's mother (Crown Prince Frederick's step-grandmother), Queen Dowager Juliana Maria, aided by Ove Høegh-Guldberg. Frederick was raised under the supervision of Margrethe Marie Thomasine Numsen.

Crown prince's regency

The coup d'état in 1784

Already in 1782, Crown Prince Frederick came in contact with the minister Andreas Peter Bernstorff, who had been dismissed two years earlier. Later the crown prince entered into a conspiracy with other disaffected persons who were in opposition to the government. Despite the crown prince's age, the government deliberately postponed his confirmation that would confirm the crown prince's adult status. But in 1784, as Crown Prince Frederik turned 16, it could no longer be postponed, and he was finally confirmed on 4 April, and was declared of legal majority. Already, on 14 April 1784, he proceeded to seize the full powers of the regency, dismissing the ministers loyal to the Queen Dowager. It is said that during the coup, he engaged in a fistfight with his half-uncle over the regency. He continued as regent of Denmark-Norway under his father's name until the latter's death in 1808.

Reforms

During the first years of the regency, Frederick instituted widespread liberal reforms in the spirit of enlightened absolutism with the assistance of Chief Minister Andreas Peter Bernstorff, including the abolition of serfdom in 1788.

Marriage
There was speculation that he was to marry a Prussian princess, a choice supported by his step-grandmother Juliana Maria and her brother-in-law Frederick the Great. To demonstrate his independence, however, he personally selected his first-cousin Marie Sophie of Hesse-Kassel, a member of a German family with close marriage links with the royal families of both Denmark and Great Britain. They married in Gottorp on 31 July 1790 and had eight children.  Their eldest daughter, Princess Caroline married her father's first cousin, Ferdinand, Hereditary Prince of Denmark. The youngest, Princess Wilhelmine, became the wife of the future Frederick VII of Denmark. None of Frederick VI's sons survived infancy and when he died, he was succeeded by his half-cousin Christian VIII of Denmark, the son of his half-uncle Prince Frederick.

The English Wars
Crises encountered during his reign include disagreement with the British over neutral shipping. This resulted in two British attacks on Copenhagen, the Battle of Copenhagen of 1801 and the Battle of Copenhagen of 1807. The conflict continued in the Gunboat War between Denmark-Norway and the United Kingdom, which lasted until the Treaty of Kiel in 1814.

King of Denmark and loss of Norway 

On 13 March 1808, Christian VII died at the age of 59 at Rendsburg during a stay in the Duchy of Holstein. At the death of his father, Frederick finally ascended the thrones of Denmark and Norway in name also as their seventh absolute monarch at the age of 40. When the throne of Sweden seemed likely to become vacant in 1809, Frederick was interested in being elected there as well. Frederick actually was the first monarch of Denmark and Norway to descend from Gustav I of Sweden, who had secured Sweden's independence in 1520s after the period of the Kalmar Union with other Scandinavian countries. However, Frederick's brother-in-law, Prince Christian Augustus of Augustenborg, was first elected to the throne of Sweden, followed by the French Marshal Bernadotte.

During the Napoleonic Wars, he tried to maintain neutrality; however, after the British bombardment of Copenhagen, he allied Denmark-Norway with Napoleon. After the French defeat in Russia in 1812, the Allies again asked him to change sides but he refused. Many historians portray the king as stubborn, incompetent, and motivated by a misconceived loyalty towards Napoleon.  However, some historians in recent years have provided a different interpretation that sheds a better light on the king. He stayed with Napoleon in order to protect the exposed situation of Norway, which was dependent on grain imports and had become the target of Swedish territorial ambitions.  He expected the wars would end with a great international conference in which Napoleon would have a major voice, and would help protect the crown's interests, especially in Norway.

After the French defeat in the Napoleonic Wars in 1814 and the loss of the Norwegian crown (as a result of the Treaty of Kiel), Frederick VI carried through an authoritarian and reactionary course, giving up the liberal ideas of his years as a prince regent. Censorship and suppression of all opposition together with the poor state of the country's economy made this period of his reign somewhat gloomy, though the king himself in general maintained his position of a well-meaning autocrat. From the 1830s the economic depression was eased a bit and from 1834 the king reluctantly accepted a small democratic innovation by the creation of the Assemblies of the Estate (purely consultative regional assemblies); this had the unintended result of later exacerbating relations between Danes and Germans in Schleswig, whose regional assembly became a forum for constant bickering between the two national groups.

Later life and succession

Frederick VI was known as a patron of astronomy and in 1832 offered gold medal prizes to anyone who discovered a comet using a telescope. His successors continued this until 1850. The prize was terminated in the aftermath of the Three Years' War. On 23 February 1827, he granted a Royal Charter giving Serampore College in Danish India the status of a university to confer degrees. It became the third Danish University after those in Copenhagen and Kiel. After the discovery of the Haraldskær Woman in a peat bog in Jutland in the year 1835, Frederick VI ordered a royal interment in an elaborately carved sarcophagus for the Iron Age mummy, decreeing it to be the body of Queen Gunnhild. Later this identification proved incorrect, but the action suited his political agenda at the time.

Frederick VI died at the age of 71 at Amalienborg Palace and was buried in Frederick V's chapel in Roskilde Cathedral. Frederick reigned over Denmark for a total of 55 years; 24 years as crown prince regent and 31 years as king. He was the 894th Knight of the Order of the Golden Fleece in Spain and the 654th Knight of the Order of the Garter in 1822. The Royal Frederick University (now University of Oslo) in Oslo was named in his honour.

As Frederick VI had no surviving sons to succeed him (only two daughters), he was succeeded on the throne of Denmark by his half-first cousin Christian, who was his father's half-brother's son.

Descendants

Frederick VI and his wife Marie of Hesse-Kassel were the parents of eight children, six of whom died in infancy. Two daughters grew to adulthood and neither of them had children. The eight children of Frederick and Marie were:
 Christian (Copenhagen, 22 September 1791 – Copenhagen, 23 September 1791)
 Marie Louise (Copenhagen, 19 November 1792 – Frederiksborg, 12 October 1793)
 Caroline (Copenhagen, 28 October 1793 – Copenhagen, 31 March 1881), married to her father's first cousin Frederick Ferdinand of Denmark, (d. 1863). Childless.
 Louise (Copenhagen, 21 August 1795 – Copenhagen, 7 December 1795)
 Christian (Copenhagen, 1 September 1797 – Copenhagen, 5 September 1797)
 Juliana Louise (Copenhagen, 12 February 1802 – Copenhagen, 23 February 1802)
 Frederikke Marie (3 June 1805 – 14 July 1805)
 Vilhelmine Marie (Kiel, 18 January 1808 – Glücksburg, 30 May 1891), married twice; firstly her second cousin Frederick (the future Frederick VII of Denmark), but they divorced, and she married secondly Karl, Duke of Schleswig-Holstein-Sonderburg-Glücksburg, who was eldest brother of the future Christian IX of Denmark. Both her marriages were childless.

By his mistress Frederikke Dannemand (Bente Mortensdatter Andersen (Rafsted)), King Frederick VI had these four children:
 Lovisa, Countess of Dannemand (16 April 1810 – 28 December 1888), married in 1836 Wilhelm von Zachariae (6 June 1807 – 16 August 1871), and had issue
 Karoline, Countess of Dannemand (1812–1844), married in 1837 Adolf Frederik Schack von Brockdorff (Vejle, 7 February 1810 – 18 October 1859), and had issue
 Frederik, Count of Dannemand (20 July 1813 – 12 March 1888), married firstly in 1840 Franziska von Scholten (1820–44), without issue, married secondly in 1845 Lovisa Grefvinde Schulin (1815–1884), without issue, and married thirdly in 1884 Wilhelmina Laursen (1840–1886), without issue
 Waldemar, Count of Dannemand (6 June 1819 – 4 March 1835)

Honours 
He received the following orders and decorations:

Ancestry

References

Citations

Bibliography

 
 
 .

External links 

 The Royal Lineage at the website of the Danish Monarchy
 Frederik VI at the website of the Royal Danish Collection at Rosenborg Castle

|-

 
1768 births
1839 deaths
19th-century Norwegian monarchs
Norwegian monarchs
Dukes of Saxe-Lauenburg
Regents of Denmark
Dukes of Schleswig
Dukes of Holstein
Denmark–Norway
Grand Crosses of the Order of Saint Stephen of Hungary
3
3
3
Knights of the Golden Fleece of Spain
Extra Knights Companion of the Garter
Burials at Roskilde Cathedral
19th-century monarchs of Denmark
Grand Commanders of the Order of the Dannebrog
Monarchs who abdicated
Children of Christian VII of Denmark